Anthony Johnson may refer to:

Politicians
Tony Johnson (Australian politician) (1924–2001), Australian politician from New South Wales
Anthony Johnson (diplomat) (1938–2021), Jamaican politician, diplomat, economist and university lecturer

Sports

American football
Anthony Sean Johnson or A. J. Johnson (born 1967), American football cornerback 
Anthony Johnson (defensive lineman) (born 1993), American football defensive end
Anthony Johnson (running back) (born 1967), American football running back
Anthony Johnson (wide receiver) (born 1995), American football wide receiver

Other sports
Anthony Johnson (basketball) (born 1974), American basketball player
Anthony Johnson (cricketer) (born 1964), Barbadian cricketer
Anthony Johnson (fighter) (1984–2022), American mixed martial artist
Tony Johnson (rower) (born 1940), American retired rower

Musicians
Anthony Rolfe Johnson (1940–2010), English operatic tenor
Anthony Johnson (musician) (born 1957), Jamaican reggae singer

Others
Anthony Johnson (actor) (1965–2021), American actor and comedian
Anthony Johnson (colonist) ( 1600–1670), freedman of African descent in early Virginia, US
Anthony Godby Johnson (born 1977), fictional author of the memoir A Rock and a Hard Place: One Boy's Triumphant Story
Anthony M. Johnson (born 1954), American experimental physicist
Anthony "White Tony" Johnson (1969–1991), gang leader of the Cheetham Hillbillies

See also
Antony and the Johnsons (active 1995–2015), American band
Anthony Johnston (disambiguation)
Anthony Johnson Showalter (1858–1924), American gospel music composer, teacher and publisher
Tony Johnson (disambiguation)